NGC 5501 is an unbarred spiral galaxy in the constellation of Virgo, registered in New General Catalogue (NGC).

Observation history
NGC 5501 was discovered by John Herschel on 13 April 1828. John Louis Emil Dreyer in the New General Catalogue, described the galaxy as "very faint, small, partially resolved, some stars seen"

Notes

References

Galaxies discovered in 1828
5501
Astronomical objects discovered in 1828
Spiral galaxies
NGC 5501
Discoveries by John Herschel
Galaxies